Gnaphalium norvegicum, the highland cudweed or Norwegian arctic cudweed, is a European species of plants in the family Asteraceae. It is widespread across much of Europe from the Mediterranean north to Finland and Iceland.

Gnaphalium norvegicum is similar to Gnaphalium sylvaticum, heath cudweed. However, it is 8 to 30 cm tall, the leaves are 3 veined, and all roughly equal in length.  The leaves are also wooly/hairy on both sides.

It is a rare plant found in central Scotland and in the northern highlands, found on acidic mountain rocks. It flowers July to August.

References

External links

Den Virtuella floran, Norsknoppa, Gnaphalium norvegicum Gunnerus in Swedish with photos
Botanik im Bild, Flora von Österreich, Gnaphalium norvegicum (Omalotheca norvegica) photos with captions in German

norvegicum
Plants described in 1772
Taxa named by Johan Ernst Gunnerus
Flora of Greenland